Bourns, Inc. is an American electronics company that develops, manufactures and supplies electronic components for a variety of industries including automotive, industrial, instrumentation, medical electronics, consumer equipment and portable electronics.

Established in Altadena, California in 1947 by Marlan and Rosemary Bourns, graduates of the University of Michigan, the company was founded to develop and sell electronic components and sensors to the aerospace industry.

Bourns has 15 manufacturing facilities around the world and has continued growing through the development of new products and technologies as well as through acquisitions.  The company has approximately 9000 employees worldwide.

Its current Chairman of the Board and CEO is Gordon Bourns, the son of the co-founders.

History
Marlan and Rosemary Bourns started the company in their  garage in Altadena, California in 1947. Their invention of linear motion and vane position potentiometers provided a method of accurately determining an aircraft's pitch, and helped to grow their business into a global corporation.

Headquartered in Riverside, California, Bourns makes and provides a broad range of electronic components and circuit protection devices including automotive sensors, circuit protection solutions, magnetic and inductor products, specialty engineering and manufacturing services, precision potentiometers, panel controls, encoders and resistive products.

Technology innovations 
In 1952, Bourns patented the trimming potentiometer, trademarked "Trimpot".  In 1995, Bourns acquired VRN's Trimmer assets and introduced the first 4 mm surface-mount sealed tact switch.  In 2008, Bourns acquired the Transient Blocking Unit (TBU) assets of Fultec Semiconductor, Inc.

Acquisitions 

 2001: Joslyn GDT Division assets
 2003: Telecom Protection assets from Texas Instruments Sensors & Controls Division
 2003: Microelectronic Modules Corporation assets
 2004: MMC's Switch Power Products assets
 2004: RUF Automotive Group
 2005: Tyco/Meggitt's Fuel Card Product assets
 2006: J.W. Miller Magnetics Business
 2006: the Automotive Controls Division assets of SSI Technologies
 2006: Polymer PTC division of Therm-O-Disc, Inc.
 2008: the Transient Blocking Unit (TBU) assets of Fultec Semiconductor, Inc.
 2008: the Protection Products assets of Emerson Network Power Energy Systems
 2009: Central Office Surge Protection Products assets from Corning Cable Systems LLC
 2012: Assets from Jensen Devices AB, Stockholm, Sweden
 2014: Komatsulite Mfg. Co., Ltd
 2015: Murata Manufacturing Co., Ltd.'s trimming potentiometer business

References

External links
Corporate website
Dialog: With Gordon L. Bourns, CEO of Bourns Inc. (Electronic Product News)
EDN: 19th Annual Innovation Awards

Electronics companies of the United States
Technology companies of the United States
Electronics companies established in 1947
Fabless semiconductor companies
Companies based in Riverside, California
1947 establishments in California